Bacchi is an Italian surname. Notable people with the surname include:

Adenor Leonardo Bacchi (born 1961), Brazilian footballer and manager
Carol Bacchi (born 1948), Canadian-Australian political scientist
Danilo Bacchi (born 1983), Italian footballer
Karina Bacchi (born 1976), Brazilian actress, model and television personality
Lucia Bacchi (born 1981), Italian volleyball player

Italian-language surnames